The Iran women's national handball team represents Iran in international handball competitions and is controlled by IR Iran Handball Federation.

Tournament record

World Championship

Asian Championship

Asian Games

West Asian Championship

Current squad
Squad for the 2021 World Women's Handball Championship.

Head coach: Ezzatollah Razmgar

References

External links

IHF profile

National team
Women's national handball teams
Handball